The Ballads of Petrica Kerempuh is a philosophically poetic work by the Croatian writer Miroslav Krleža, composed in the form of thirty poems between December 1935 and March 1936.

The work spans a period of five centuries, focusing around the commoner prophet Petrica Kerempuh, who is a type of Croatian Till Eulenspiegel. 
It is written in a language based on the Kajkavian dialect. Krleža's use of language is heavily interspersed with archaic words of Latin, German, and Hungarian origin as Kajkavian has many Latin, German, and Hungarian loanwords when compared to standard Croatian, which has many more loanwords from Turkish. This difference is evident in the work comes from the two languages belonging to two distinct cultural circles: the former to central Europe and the latter to the historically Ottoman-controlled Balkans. 

Krleža did not typically write in Kajkavian, but decided to put the dialect into focus for the ballads. Literary critics argue that he succeeded in showing that — even if in his time Kajkavian was not used in formal domains of life — it was still possible to create a work of great literal expression in it and that the Kajkavian dialect was not a less valuable literary language.

The poem is generally considered a masterpiece of Krleža's literary opus and of Croatian literature.

The Ballads have been translated (mostly only in part) into Slovene, Italian, Macedonian, Hungarian, Czech, French, Russian, and Arabic. A full German translation was published in 2016.

References

1936 books
Modernist works
Works by Miroslav Krleža
Poetry by Miroslav Krleža
Croatian poetry
1936 poetry books